ProPain is Mars Ill's 2004 album.

Track listing 
 Pro Pain Intro
 Say So
 Sound Off
 Dog Ear Page
 More ft. Ahmad of 4th Avenue Jones and Anthony David
 Just the Two of Us
 Stand Back and Watch
 Wicked Ways
 All Out
 Saturday Night Special ft. Ishues and D.R.E.S the Beatnik
 Higher
 Moment
 Effortless ft. XL:144
 Loud!
 Write of Passage ft. Ben Hameen and J-Mil
 When Heaven Scrapes the Pavement
 I Is
 We Out

Re-releases
ProPain was re-released as Pro*Pain in 2006 and a remix, Slow Flame, was released in 2007.

References

External links

2004 albums
Mars Ill albums